Thomas F. Brennan (August 6, 1930 – February 11, 1990) was an American basketball player. He played collegiately for the Villanova University. Brennan was selected by the Philadelphia Warriors in the 1952 NBA draft. He played for the Warriors (1954–55) in the NBA for 11 games.

References

External links

1930 births
1990 deaths
American men's basketball players
Basketball players from New York City
Forwards (basketball)
Philadelphia Warriors draft picks
Philadelphia Warriors players
Sportspeople from Brooklyn
Villanova Wildcats men's basketball players